Greater Hartford is a region located in the U.S. state of Connecticut, centered on the state's capital of Hartford. It represents the only combined statistical area in Connecticut defined by a city within the state, being bordered by the Greater Boston region to the northeast and New York metropolitan area to the south and west. Sitting at the southern end of the Metacomet Ridge, its geology is characterized by land of a level grade along the shores of Connecticut River Valley, with loamy, finer-grained soil than other regions in the state. 
Greater Hartford (the metropolitan area as defined by the U.S. Census Bureau), had a total population of 1,213,531 at the 2020 United States census.

Hartford's role as a focal point for the American insurance industry is known nationally. The metropolitan area's affluence and its vibrant music and arts scene define the region's culture. The region's economy is closely tied with Springfield, Massachusetts, with both cities being served by Bradley International Airport and with their shared presence within the Knowledge Corridor, being only 25 miles apart. The area is also served by the smaller Hartford-Brainard Airport.

Definitions

New England City and Town Area
New England City and Town Areas (NECTA) are cluster of cities and towns throughout all of New England defined by the Office of Management and Budget. The Hartford-East Hartford-Middletown, CT Metropolitan NECTA consists of 54 towns, including 25 in Hartford County, 5 in Litchfield County, 6 in Middlesex County, 2 in New London County, 12 in Tolland County, and 4 in Windham County.

Metropolitan Statistical Area

The United States Census Bureau also defines the Hartford–East Hartford–Middletown, CT Metropolitan Statistical Area (MSA) based on towns as building blocks. The area contains 54 towns of Hartford County, Tolland County, and Middlesex County. The 2015 population estimate for the MSA is 1,211,324, and is ranked as the 47th-largest metropolitan area by population in the United States. The MSA definition of the area contains a significant portion of the Lower Connecticut River Valley, which is not commonly considered as part of Greater Hartford.

A region very similar to the MSA is covered by the combination of the Hartford Service Delivery Area and the Mid-Connecticut Service Delivery Area, covering 56 towns.

Municipalities with 100,000 or more inhabitants
 Hartford

Municipalities with 50,000 to 100,000 inhabitants
 Bristol 
 East Hartford
 Manchester 
 New Britain 
 West Hartford

Municipalities with 10,000 to 50,000 inhabitants

 Avon
 Berlin 
 Bloomfield 
 Canton
 Clinton
 Colchester
 Coventry
 Cromwell
 East Hampton
 East Windsor
 Ellington
 Enfield
 Farmington
 Glastonbury 
 Granby
 Mansfield 
 Middletown
 Newington 
 Old Saybrook
 Plainville
 Rocky Hill
 Simsbury 
 Somers
 South Windsor 
 Southington
 Stafford
 Suffield
 Tolland
 Vernon 
 Wethersfield 
 Windsor 
 Windsor Locks

Municipalities with 1,000 to 10,000 inhabitants

 Andover
 Bolton 
 Burlington 
 Chester
 Columbia 
 Deep River 
 Durham 
 East Granby 
 East Haddam 
 Essex 
 Haddam 
 Hartland
 Hebron 
 Killingworth 
 Marlborough 
 Middlefield 
 North Stonington
 Portland 
 Westbrook 
 Willington

Municipalities with fewer than 1,000 inhabitants

 Union 

 Town also included in the Springfield, Massachusetts NECTA

Economy

Notable companies based in Hartford city proper

 Aetna 
 Eversource Energy (co-headquarters in Boston)
 The Hartford
 Hartford Steam Boiler Inspection and Insurance Company 
 The Phoenix Companies
 Travelers Insurance (home of largest office, headquarters in New York City)
 Virtus Investment Partners

Notable companies based in surrounding towns
 Barnes Group (Bristol)
 Carrier Corporation (Farmington)
 Cigna (Bloomfield)
 Colt's Manufacturing Company (West Hartford)
 Connecticut Natural Gas (East Hartford)
 Doosan Fuel Cell America (South Windsor)
 ESPN Inc. (Bristol)
 Gerber Scientific (Tolland)
 Henkel (Rocky Hill, U.S. headquarters) 
 Kaman Aircraft (Bloomfield)
 Legrand (West Hartford, U.S. headquarters)
 Otis Elevator (Farmington)
 Pratt & Whitney (East Hartford)
 Stanadyne (Windsor)
 Stanley Black & Decker (New Britain)
 Systematic Automation (Farmington)
 Trumpf (Farmington, U.S. headquarters)
 United Technologies (Farmington) 
 Voya Financial (Windsor, home of largest office, headquarters in New York City)

 Division of United Technologies (Otis and Carrier are under the UTC Building & Industrial Systems division)

Higher education

Public colleges and universities
Public, four-year universities in the area include:.

 Central Connecticut State University (New Britain)
 University of Connecticut (Storrs, main campus)
 University of Connecticut School of Dental Medicine (Farmington)
 University of Connecticut School of Law (Hartford)
 University of Connecticut School of Medicine (Farmington)

Community and technical colleges
Public, two-year community colleges in the area include: 
 Asnuntuck Community College (Enfield) 
 Capital Community College (Hartford)
 Manchester Community College (Manchester)
 Middlesex Community College (Middletown)
 Tunxis Community College (Farmington)

Private colleges and universities
Private, nonprofit, four-year universities in the area include:

 Goodwin College (East Hartford)
 Hartford Seminary (Hartford)
 Rensselaer at Hartford (Hartford)
 Trinity College (Hartford)
 University of Hartford (West Hartford)
 University of Saint Joseph (West Hartford)
 Wesleyan University (Middletown)

Healthcare
There are numerous hospitals in the Greater Hartford area, including five teaching hospitals (of which, one is a pediatric hospital) and two psychiatric hospitals.

Teaching hospitals

 Connecticut Children's Medical Center (Hartford)
 Hartford Hospital (Hartford)
 The Hospital of Central Connecticut (New Britain and Southington)
 Saint Francis Hospital & Medical Center (Hartford)
 University of Connecticut Health Center, John Dempsey Hospital (Farmington)
All of the above hospitals are affiliated with the University of Connecticut School of Medicine

Psychiatric hospitals
Connecticut Valley Hospital, owned and operated by the state of Connecticut (Middletown)
The Institute of Living, a division of Hartford Hospital (Hartford)

Culture and attractions

Performing arts

The Bushnell Center for the Performing Arts is one of the largest indoor performing arts venues in the area. It houses two theaters within the complex: the 2,800-seat Mortensen Hall and the 906-seat Belding Theater, and is home to the Hartford Symphony Orchestra, the premiere orchestra in Connecticut. Other theaters in the area include the Hartford Stage and TheaterWorks.

The area is also home to the Xfinity Theatre, a 7,500-seat open-air amphitheater. The lawn outside the theater is capable of holding roughly 22,500 people, bringing total capacity to around 30,000 people.

Conventions and exhibitions
The Connecticut Convention Center is located in downtown Hartford adjacent to the Hartford Marriot Downtown. Since 2005, it has hosted ConnectiCon, an annual, multi-genre, pop culture convention.

The New England Air Museum in Windsor Locks also hosts many events, with three large hangars available for use. One of the more popular events held there is FlightSimCon.

In addition, AOPA has held their annual aviation summit in Hartford.

Notable museums

 American Clock & Watch Museum (Bristol)
 Connecticut Historical Society (Hartford)
 The Children's Museum, Connecticut (West Hartford)
 Connecticut Science Center (Hartford)
 Connecticut State Library, Museum of Connecticut History  (Hartford)
 Connecticut Trolley Museum (East Windsor)
 New Britain Museum of American Art (New Britain)
 New England Air Museum (Windsor Locks)
 Old State House (Hartford)
 Wadsworth Atheneum (Hartford)

Sports
Greater Hartford is home to multiple minor league professional sports teams and college teams. There are currently no major league professional sports teams. However, it was home to the Hartford Whalers ice hockey team from 1974 to 1997. The Whalers came to Hartford playing in the World Hockey Association, until they were admitted to the National Hockey League in 1979. In 1997, the team relocated to North Carolina, where they were renamed the Carolina Hurricanes.

Throughout the mid-1990s, the New England Patriots were negotiating with the state of Connecticut for a brand new football stadium located in downtown Hartford to replace the aging Foxboro Stadium where they played. The team eventually agreed to another proposal that saw the construction of Gillette Stadium. With the Patriots no longer in the equation, the state instead decided to construct a smaller football stadium on the former United Technologies-owned airfield in East Hartford. Pratt & Whitney Stadium at Rentschler Field seats approximately 40,000 spectators and is home to the Connecticut Huskies football team.

Professional sports teams

Collegiate sports teams

Greater Hartford is also home to the Travelers Championship golf tournament  (formerly known as the Greater Hartford Open/Buick Championship).

Shopping centers

Major shopping centers in the area include:
 Blue Back Square (West Hartford)
 Enfield Square Mall (Enfield)
 The Shoppes at Buckland Hills (Manchester)
 Westfarms Mall (West Hartford)

Media

Print 
The Hartford Courant is the daily broadsheet newspaper serving the Greater Hartford area. Founded in 1764 as the Connecticut Courant, it is generally considered to be the oldest continually published newspaper in the United States. It is owned by Tribune Publishing.

From 1817 to 1976, the area was also served by another daily newspaper, the Hartford Times.

Television 
Greater Hartford and Greater New Haven form a single television market. This television market is served by the following broadcast television stations:

English language

 WFSB (CBS)
 WTNH (ABC)
 WCCT (The CW)
 WEDH (PBS)
 WHPX (Ion Television)
 WVIT (NBC)
 WCTX (My Network TV)
 WTIC (Fox)

Spanish language

 WUVN (Univision)
 WHCT (Azteca)
 WUTH (UniMás)
 WRDM (Telemundo)

Transportation

Road

Interstate highways
Highway transportation in Greater Hartford is primarily run by two mainline Interstates:

There were several plans to expand the highway system (with at least one plan calling for a full beltway). Various plans encountered resistance due to budgetary and environmental concerns. However, some highways were ultimately constructed, if only partially:
 (serves as the northeastern portion of the partial beltway)
 (spur route into eastern Connecticut)
 (originally a connection to Willimantic)

U.S. Routes 
In the area, four major U.S. Routes serve the area's towns/cities:

Other major expressways
Some state highways also serve as major expressways:

 (initially part of the larger I-491 plan)
 (serves as the southwestern portion of the partial beltway)

Bus
Public bus transportation is operated by the Hartford division of CTTransit. It provides service to 30 local routes and 12 express routes seven days a week throughout the metropolitan area.

2015 saw the opening of the CTfastrak, a bus rapid transit system that runs from downtown New Britain to Hartford Union Station. The dedicated busway is over 9 miles long and stops at 10 stations.

Airport
Bradley International Airport  is located in the town of Windsor Locks, approximately 10 miles from Hartford. Bradley is the second-largest airport in New England (behind Logan International Airport), and was ranked the 55th busiest airport in the United States in 2008. Southwest Airlines, Delta Air Lines, JetBlue Airways, and US Airways account for more than half of the airport's passenger traffic. The Bradley Airport Connector provides highway access to the airport from Interstate 91.

Bradley is a dual-use civil/military airport, with the Bradley Air National Guard Base serving as the home of the Connecticut Air National Guard 103d Airlift Wing.

Hartford–Brainard Airport  is a smaller reliever airport located in the southeastern section of Hartford. It is primarily used for general aviation purposes.

Rail
Several Amtrak routes run through the metropolitan area, including the Northeast Regional, Vermonter, as well as a daily shuttle between New Haven and Springfield, Massachusetts.

The Hartford Line is a commuter rail service between New Haven, Connecticut, and Springfield, Massachusetts, using the Amtrak-owned New Haven–Springfield Line. CTrail-branded trains provide service along the corridor, and riders can use Hartford Line tickets to travel on board most Amtrak trains along the corridor at the same prices. The service launched on June 16, 2018.

References

 
Regions of Connecticut
Metropolitan areas of Connecticut
Geography of Hartford, Connecticut
Northeast megalopolis